Conchylodes diphteralis is a moth in the family Crambidae. It was described by Carl Geyer in 1832. It is found from the southeastern United States, where it has been recorded from Florida, through the West Indies (including Cuba, Jamaica and Hispaniola) to South America.

The wingspan is 24–29 mm. Adults are on wing nearly year round in Florida.

The larvae feed on Cordia species.

References

Moths described in 1832
Spilomelinae